Faces is an album by Hungarian guitarist Gábor Szabó featuring performances recorded in 1977 and released on the Mercury label.

Reception
The Allmusic review states "The iconoclastic guitarist's final American record suffers producer Wayne Henderson's dated disco tendencies. But by the time the needle finds side two, some genuinely beautiful performances emerge".

Track listing
All compositions by Gábor Szabó except as indicated
 "The Biz" (Bobby Lyle) - 4:35 
 "Magic Mystic Faces" - 5:19 
 "Gloomy Day" (Wayne Henderson, Sylvia St. James) - 5:52 
 "Desiring You" (William Jeffery) - 6:05 
 "Misty Malarky Ying Yang" (Marlon McClain) - 6:59 
 "Alicia" - 5:37 
 "The Last Song" - 6:35
 "Estaté" (Bruno Martino) - 3:28
Recorded at ABC Studios in Los Angeles, California in March and April 1977

Personnel
Gábor Szabó - guitar
James O. Stewart - guitar
Oscar Brashear, Denny Christianson - trumpet
George Bohannon - trombone
Ernie Watts - tenor saxophone
Bobby Lyle - electric piano
Dean Gant - synthesizer
Marlon McClain - electric guitar
Nathaniel Phillips - electric bass
Bruce Carter - drums
Rini Kramer - cabassa, percussion
Vance Tenort, Paul C. Shure, Bonnie Douglas, Assa Drori, Irving Geller, Irma Neumann, Haim Shtrum, Carroll Stephens, Robert Sushel - violin
James Dunham, Janet Lakatos - viola
Nathan Gershman, David H. Speltz - cello
Sylvia St. James, Deborah Shotlow, Suandra Alexander, Cheryl Alexander - vocals
William Jeffrey - arranger
Wayne Henderson - horn arrangements

References

Mercury Records albums
Gábor Szabó albums
1977 albums
Albums produced by Wayne Henderson (musician)